The 1980 New South Wales Open  was a combined men's and women's tennis tournament played on outdoor grass courts at the White City Stadium in Sydney, Australia. The men's event, also known by its sponsored name Nabisco NSW Open, was part of the 1980 Volvo Grand Prix circuitand was held from 15 December through 21 December 1980. The women's event, also known by its sponsored name NSW Building Society Classic, was part of the 1980 Colgate Series and was held from 1 December through 7 December 1980. It was the 88th edition of the event. The singles titles were won by unseeded Fritz Buehning and third-seeded Wendy Turnbull.

Finals

Men's singles
 Fritz Buehning defeated  Brian Teacher 6–3, 6–7, 7–6

Women's singles
 Wendy Turnbull defeated  Pam Shriver 3–6, 6–4, 7–6(10–8)

Men's doubles
 Peter McNamara /  Paul McNamee defeated  Vitas Gerulaitis /  Brian Gottfried 6–2, 6–4

Women's doubles
 Pam Shriver /  Betty Stöve defeated  Rosie Casals /  Wendy Turnbull 6–1, 4–6, 6–4

References

External links
 Association of Tennis Professionals (ATP) tournament profile
 Women's Tennis Association (WTA) tournament profile
 Women's Tennis Association (WTA) tournament edition details
 International Tennis Federation (ITF) men's tournament edition details

Sydney International
New South Wales Open
New South Wales Open
New South Wales Open, 1980